The TELMAG (Tren Electromagnético - Spanish for 'Electromagnetic Train') is an ongoing research project which was born in the Instituto Venezolano de Investigaciones Científicas (IVIC) in 1967, and later continued by the Universidad de Los Andes, Venezuela. The TELMAG is a ground mass transport system that does not require mechanical friction for drive and guidance as conventional trains do.

Overview
The main idea of this system is to use a linear reluctance motor for drive, guidance and suspension. This motor uses the same forces that drive rotative motors, but without a mechanical transmission to apply the torque to the vehicle wheels. Instead, these forces are applied between the vehicle and the rail, reducing mechanical friction and wear. Also, the TELMAGV can climb steeper gradients than a conventional system because it does not depend on friction between wheel and rail for propulsion.

Project background

In 1967, three IVIC investigators, inspired by Venezuela's complicated topography, initiated a research project about a more efficient traction system that could work on steeply-graded routes. An example is the Caracas – La Guaira route that, in only 10 kilometres, climbs 800 metres. This route is critical because Venezuela's most important airport and port are located in La Guaira.

List of TELMAG 1:10 scale prototypes

Safety
The electromagnetic trains are a safe mass transport system. Additionally electromagnetic systems (like the TELMAG) have a motor's design, that make impossible its derailment, making them even safer than conventional systems.

Environmental benefits
For many years, trains have been the most environmentally friendly transport system. Furthermore, promotes economic growth because the investment in this kind of transport stimulates the development of new technologies. For these reasons, and to reduce traffic jams and pollution, research on cleaner, safer, faster and more efficient transport systems must be done.

The electromagnetic train is one of the most environmentally friendly systems because it is a completely electrical system and does not create direct pollution. Also, the elevated monorail system and hill climbing capabilities guarantee a minimal environmental impact. This makes the system compatible with the fragile and rich ecosystems because this kind of track requires less earthmoving than conventional systems. Likewise, generated electromagnetic fields meets international standards.

The future
It is likely that future railways, built on plains or in mountainous regions, will be elevated because this way the track is less vulnerable to floods and landslides produced by violent weather. The fate of the trains from Caracas - La Guaira, Caracas - Valencia, La Ceiba - La Fría - El Vigía, was a consequence of floods and landslides.

References

External links 

 Resum de presentació de TELMAGV als mitjans
 Projecte en Casa de Venezuela

Monorails in Venezuela
Linear motor metros
1967 establishments in Venezuela